The Kavli Prize was established in 2005 as a joint venture of the Norwegian Academy of Science and Letters, the Norwegian Ministry of Education and Research, and the Kavli Foundation. It honors, supports, and recognizes scientists for outstanding work in the fields of astrophysics, nanoscience and neuroscience. Three prizes are awarded every second year. Each of the three Kavli Prizes consists of a gold medal, a scroll, and a cash award of US$1,000,000.

The first Kavli Prizes were awarded on 9 September 2008 in Oslo, presented by Haakon, Crown Prince of Norway.

Selection committees

The Norwegian Academy of Science and Letters appoints three prize committees consisting of leading international scientists after receiving recommendations made from the following organisations:

Chinese Academy of Sciences
French Academy of Sciences
Max Planck Society
United States National Academy of Sciences
Norwegian Academy of Science and Letters
Royal Society

Laureates

Astrophysics

Nanoscience

Neuroscience

See also 

 List of general science and technology awards 
 List of astronomy awards
 List of neuroscience awards
 The Brain Prize
 Golden Brain Award
 Gruber Prize in Neuroscience
 W. Alden Spencer Award
 Karl Spencer Lashley Award
 Mind & Brain Prize
 Ralph W. Gerard Prize in Neuroscience

References

External links
The Kavli Prize, official site
The Kavli Prize on The Kavli Foundation site
The Norwegian Ministry of Education and Research

Science and technology awards
Awards established in 2005
Astrophysics
Neuroscience awards
Norwegian science and technology awards

Astronomy prizes